Washington, D.C., held its first direct election for its mayor on November 5, 1974. It followed the passage of the District of Columbia Home Rule Act by the U.S. Congress in 1973. The election was won by Walter Washington, a Democrat.

As with every mayoral election that followed, the 1974 race was at its most intense in the Democratic Primary, with 90 percent of DC's voters registered as Democrats. The primary contest was a seven-person race, but the highest profile candidates were Walter Washington, then incumbent as the presidentially appointed Mayor-Commissioner, and Clifford Alexander Jr., former chairman of the Equal Employment Opportunity Commission. Washington was by far the favorite at the start of the campaign in May 1974, but tightened as the September primary drew closer. Washington won the September 10 primary, 53%-47%.

References

1974
Washington
Mayoral
Washington, D.C.